Mark C. Walczyk (WALL-sic; born July 3, 1985) is an American politician and US Army Reserve Engineer Officer from the state of New York. A Republican, Walczyk represents the 49th district of the New York State Senate. Walczyk won the seat in 2022, after serving in the New York State Assembly.

Early life 
Born in Syracuse, NY, to Robert S. Walczyk, Jr. and Carolyn A. Walczyk (Foland), Walczyk is a graduate of the State University of New York, Albany. At age 26, Walczyk joined the US Army Reserve. He currently serves as a captain in the 791st Forward Engineer Support Team (FEST).

Political career 
In 2007, while attending SUNY Albany Walczyk interned in the NYS Senate through Student Programs. Later, in 2010, Walczyk worked on State Senator Patty Ritchie’s campaign and worked as her Legislative Director in the State's Capitol thereafter. In 2013 he was appointed as Ritchie's district director.

In 2015, Walczyk successfully ran for the Watertown City Council in a 4-way race. He served on the council for 3 years before being elected to the Assembly.

Walczyk announced in May 2018 that he would challenge incumbent Democratic Assemblywoman Addie Jenne, who had represented the Assembly's 116th district for ten years. That November, Walczyk defeated Jenne with 53% of the vote.

In the Assembly, Walczyk served as the ranking Republican on the Higher Education Committee and member of the following committees: Social Services, Cities, Energy, and Transportation. In January, 2020, Walczyk was appointed to the Legislative Commission on Rural Resources. Walczyk considers himself an environmentalist and earned a 56% rating from the NY League of Conservation Voters.

During the onset of the COVID-19 pandemic, Mark Walczyk was activated with his role in the Army Reserves to help battle the coronavirius.

Mark Walczyk has also worked to strengthen tourism and the local agriculture industry] in parts of his district.  Walczyk sponsored legislation that was signed into law that added two wineries in Jefferson County to the Thousand Islands-Seaway Wine Trail.

In 2020, Mark Walczyk ran for reelection.  He won against his opponent, Alex Hammond.  Walczyk garnered more than 60% of the vote.

In February 2022, Walczyk announced that he would be running for the newly drawn 50th State Senate District.

Military service 
In 2012, Walczyk was recruited to serve as an Engineer Officer in the Army Reserve. In January 2013 he attended Basic Combat Training and Officer Candidates School at Ft. Benning, GA. In addition, Second Lieutenant Walczyk stayed for Airborne School and earned his jump wings.

In August 2013, he attended the Air Assault course at Fort Drum, NY's Light Fighter School and earned his Air Assault Badge along with high accolades for the fastest 12-mile ruck time in his class.

Second Lieutenant Walczyk was assigned the role of Executive Officer of the 479th Engineer Battalions’ Forward Support Company.

In 2015, he attended Basic Officer Leadership Course in Fort Leonard Wood, Sapper Leader Course, and was reassigned as a Platoon Leader in the 366th  Engineer Company, Canton, NY, and promoted to First Lieutenant.

In July 2016, First Lieutenant Walczyk was ordered to take command of the 366th Engineer Company. He served and led though WAREX (Ft. McCoy) that year, JRTC (Ft. Polk) in 2017, and NTC (Ft. Irwin) in 2018.

Personal life
Walczyk lives in Watertown with his wife, Jessica, where they're restoring a downtown building to its former glory.

A lifetime angler, Walczyk enjoys fishing in his free time as well as hiking, camping, and spending time with family on the water. He is a member of the Watertown Noontime Rotary Club, Jefferson County Animal Cruelty Task Force, American Legion Post 61, Italian American Civic Association, Friends of the MAC Nature Center, and Friends of Thompson Park. He is also a parishioner of the New Life Christian Church in Watertown.

Ironman 
Walczyk got involved in tri-sport young, participating in Henderson Harbor Triathlon at age 13. To date, he's competed in several local triathlons and completed four full Ironman distance races:

 2007 Ford Ironman Florida:  13:07:25
 2010 Ford Ironman Lake Placid: 12:50:13
 2011 Ford Ironman Cozumel: 11:42:32
 2017 Ironman Maryland: 12:19:48

References

Living people
Politicians from Watertown, New York
Republican Party members of the New York State Assembly
21st-century American politicians
New York (state) city council members
University at Albany, SUNY alumni
1985 births